The 2001 Canadian Figure Skating Championships were held on January 16–21, 2001 at the Winnipeg Arena in Winnipeg, Manitoba. They were the figure skating national championship which determines the national champions of Canada. The event was organized by Skate Canada, the nation's figure skating governing body. Skaters competed at the senior and junior levels in the disciplines of men's singles, ladies' singles, pair skating, and ice dancing. Due to the large number of competitors, the senior men's and senior ladies' qualifying rounds were split into two groups. The results of this competition were used to pick the Canadian teams to the 2001 World Championships, the 2001 Four Continents Championships, and the 2001 World Junior Championships.

Senior results

Men

Ladies

Pairs

Ice dancing

Junior results

Men

Ladies

Pairs

Ice dancing

External links
 2001 Bank of Montreal Canadian Championships

Canadian Figure Skating Championships
Figure skating
Canadian Figure Skating Championships
Sports competitions in Winnipeg
2001 in Manitoba